Nicolaas Johannes "Nico" Diederichs (17 November 1903, Ladybrand – 21 August 1978) served as the third state president of South Africa from 1975 to 1978.

Education and career
After completing school, he attended Grey University College between 1921 and 1925 where he obtained a Bachelor of Arts (Dutch & Ethics) and Master of Arts (Philosophy). As an economist, he educated himself overseas at universities in Munich, Cologne, Berlin and Leiden, obtaining a doctorate from the University of Leiden and a D.Litt degree. Resuming a career in South Africa, he became a lecturer and later a professor at the University of the Orange Free State, in Political Science and Philosophy. During the 1930s and 1940s he became a prominent figure in Afrikaner nationalist circles. He founded the Reddingsdaadbond organisation to promote the economic wellbeing of Afrikaners.

Political career
Diederichs was a National Party member of Parliament from 1953 to 1975. He served as Minister of Economic Affairs from 1958 to 1967, as Minister of Mines from 1961 to 1964, and as Minister of Finance from 1967 to 1975. In the latter capacity he became known as "Mr Gold". He served as the first chancellor of the Rand Afrikaans University and ceremonial State President of South Africa from 1975 until his death, after a short illness, of a heart attack on 21 August 1978 in Cape Town.

Honours
Diederichs was honoured with medals from various countries. he was awarded a gold medal from the City of Paris (1971), made a Knight of the Greater Cross of the Order of Merit of the Italian Republic in 1973 and an Order of Merit from Paraguay in 1974. He was awarded honoury doctoral degrees from the Universities of the Orange Free State and Stellenbosch.

Depiction on coins
He is depicted on the obverses of the 1979 coins of the South African rand from 1/2 Cent to 1 Rand, which was struck as a memorial commemorative series.

Publications by Nicolaas Diederichs (selection) 

 Nicolaas Diederichs: Vom Leiden und Dulden. Bonn, 1930. (Dissertation Leiden University)
 N. Diederichs: Die Volkebond, sy ontstaan, samestelling en werksaamhede. Pretoria, 1933
 N. Diederichs: Nasionalisme as lewensbeskouing en sy verhouding tot internasionalisme. Bloemfontein, 1936

References

Specific

Bibliography
 Eric Rosenthal (ed.): Encyclopaedia of Southern Africa. Juta and Company Limited, Kaapstad en Johannesburg, 1978.

External links 

 Website South African History about Nicolaas Diederichs

1903 births
1978 deaths
People from Ladybrand
Afrikaner people
Afrikaner nationalists
South African people of German descent
National Party (South Africa) politicians
State Presidents of South Africa
Finance ministers of South Africa
Members of the House of Assembly (South Africa)
Leiden University alumni